In topology, a branch of mathematics, a cubical set is a set-valued contravariant functor on the category of (various) n-cubes.

Cubical sets have been often considered as an alternative to simplicial sets in combinatorial topology, including in the early work of Daniel Kan and Jean-Pierre Serre. It has been also developed in computer science, in particular in concurrency theory and in homotopy type theory.

See also 
Simplicial presheaf

References 

http://ncatlab.org/nlab/show/cubical+set
 Rick Jardine, Cubical sets, Lecture 12 in "Lectures on simplicial presheaves" https://web.archive.org/web/20110104053206/http://www.math.uwo.ca/~jardine/papers/sPre/index.shtml

Topology